Yang Xiong (53 BCE–18 CE) was a Chinese philosopher, poet, and politician of the Western Han dynasty known for his philosophical writings and fu poetry compositions.

Life and career
Like a number of the other well-known writers of the Han dynasty, Yang was from Shu (modern Sichuan province), specifically the area of Pi  (modern Pi County, Sichuan). Yang claimed that his family had moved south from the state of Jin during its civil infighting in the 6th century BCE.  As a youth Yang was an admirer and imitator of his elder Shu compatriot Sima Xiangru and the "grand fu" style of the early Han period.  His ability and success in fu composition earned him a summons to the imperial capital at Chang'an to serve as an "Expectant Official", responsible for composing poems and fu for the emperor.

Yang's position required him to praise the virtue and glory of Emperor Cheng of Han and the grandeur of imperial outings, but he was disturbed by the wasteful extravagance of the imperial court. Yang attempted to return the fu genre to a focus of "suasive admonition" (fèng 諷), which he believed was the original purpose of the earliest fu-type writings of Qu Yuan, but his couched admonitions against extravagance went unnoticed and unheeded by Emperor Cheng.

Yang's most famous work, Exemplary Sayings (Fa yan 法言) is a philosophical work modeled on the Analects of Confucius (Lunyu), in which Yang criticizes fu writers for focusing on ornate, esoteric language while ignoring more important issues of morality. Yang's other works include Great Mystery (Tai xuan 太玄), a divination text based on the Classic of Changes (Yijing), "Justification Against Ridicule" (Jie chao 解嘲), one of the best known of the "fu of frustration" category of fu, and Fangyan, a collection of regional dialectal terms from the various parts of China in his era.

Together with Sima Xiangru, Yang was one of the most famous and illustrious figures of the entire Han dynasty. The Book of Han devotes a full two-part chapter to both Yang and Sima, an honor surpassing that of even the most famous generals and ministers.

Philosophy
He did not believe human nature was inherently good as Mencius (fl. 4th century BCE) had written, nor inherently bad as Xunzi (c. 300–230 BCE) had written, but came into existence as a mixture of both.  He was a close associate of the official and philosopher Huan Tan (d. 28 CE), an Old Texts realist who may have heavily influenced the works of Wang Chong (27–c. 100 CE). Yang is also known for his protest against the verbosity of the fu. He was hailed by Huan Tan as the "Confucius from the western parts".

References
Footnotes

Works Cited
 Chen, Keming and Zhang, Shancheng, "Yang Xiong". Encyclopedia of China (Philosophy Edition), 1st ed.
  
 
 
 Zhu, Binjie, "Yang Xiong". Encyclopedia of China (Chinese Literature Edition), 1st ed.

External links
 Yang Xiong, Internet Encyclopedia of Philosophy biography
 
 方言: 13卷 (1873 edition)
 Full text of Yang Xiong's Fa Yan (English and Chinese) - Chinese Text Project
 Yang Xiong, Qin Shi Bu (琴史補; "Appended History of the Guqin") article

53 BC births
18 deaths
1st-century BC Chinese philosophers
1st-century BC Chinese poets
1st-century Chinese philosophers
1st-century Chinese poets
Han dynasty philosophers
Han dynasty poets
Han dynasty politicians from Sichuan
Poets from Sichuan
Politicians from Chengdu
Writers from Chengdu